Maria Pangalou (born April 28, 1979, Thessaloniki) is a Greek rhythmic gymnast.

Pangalou competed for Greece in the rhythmic gymnastics individual all-around competition at the 1996 Summer Olympics in Atlanta. There, she was 8th in the qualification round and advanced to the semifinal. In the semifinal she was 12th and didn't advance to the final of 10 competitors.

References

External links 
 

1979 births
Living people
Greek rhythmic gymnasts
Gymnasts at the 1996 Summer Olympics
Olympic gymnasts of Greece
Gymnasts from Thessaloniki
Medalists at the Rhythmic Gymnastics European Championships